Alinta Energy is an Australian electricity generating and gas retailing private company owned by Hong Kongbased Chow Tai Fook Enterprises (CTFE). It was sold for $4 billion and was approved Treasurer Scott Morrison in 2017. Alinta Energy has an owned and contracted generation portfolio of up to 1,957 MW, approximately 1.1 million combined electricity and gas retail customers and around 800 employees across Australia and New Zealand.

In March 2011, due to a deleveraging transaction by the TPG Group, Alinta became Alinta Energy. Alinta Energy was acquired by Hong Kongbased Chow Tai Fook Enterprises in 2017. Chow Tai Fook Enterprises also acquired Loy Yang B power station with assists from Alinta Energy staff.

In May 2018, Alinta Energy was announced as the principal partner of the Australian Men's cricket team on a four-year deal, the longest in Australian Cricket history. The Alinta Energy logo will feature on the players' kits for all international matches played in Australia.

Electricity generation 

Alinta Energy's approximately 3,000MW electricity generation portfolio includes:
 Port Hedland Power Station, Western Australia
 Newman Power Station, Western Australia
 Pinjarra Power Station, Western Australia
 Wagerup Power Station, Western Australia
 Goldfields Gas Pipeline, Western Australia
 Reeves Plain Power Station (Proposed), South Australia
 Braemar Power Station, Queensland
 Bairnsdale Power Station, Victoria
 Loy Yang B Power Station, Victoria
 Glenbrook Power Station, New Zealand

Natural gas 
Alinta Energy's gas assets portfolio includes:
 Goldfields Gas Pipeline

Downstream electricity and natural gas retail 
Electricity: 2012 saw Alinta Energy enter the South Australia and Victoria markets for electricity customers.
Natural Gas: 700,000 gas customers (Western Australia)

Other assets
Flinders Power, a division of Alinta Energy, in May 2016 permanently closed Playford A Power Station, Playford B Power Station and Northern Power Station and is in the process of demolishing and remediating the sites. The mining operations at Telford Cut Leigh Creek, which supplied coal to these power stations, ceased in 2015.

Alinta Energy is in the process of seeking approval to build the Reeves Plains Power Station, a new gas-turbine power station in South Australia.

References

External links 
 Alinta Energy website

Electric power companies of Australia
Companies based in Sydney
Utility companies of Australia
Natural gas companies of Australia
Australian subsidiaries of foreign companies
2017 mergers and acquisitions